Riccardo Lattanzi (10 April 1934 – 13 July 1991) was an Italian international football referee.

References

External links 
 
 Profile at worldreferee.com
 Profile at bdfutbol.com

1934 births
1991 deaths
Italian football referees
Football referees at the 1980 Summer Olympics